Discovering Psychology is an introductory textbook on psychology written by Don H. Hockenbury and Sandra E. Hockenbury. Don Hockenbury is a recipient of the Tulsa Community College Award for Teaching Excellence.

References

English-language books
2001 non-fiction books
Psychology textbooks